Blue Boar may refer to:

 Blue Boar Quadrangle
 Blue Boar Street in Oxford
 Blue Boar Cafeterias, a defunct cafeteria chain in the Southern United States
 Blue Boar cafe at Watford Gap services
 The Blue Boar, a former public house in Grantham
 Blue Boar (bomb), a cold war era television-guided bomb
 Blue Boar, York, a pub